La Chaux-de-Fonds-Est railway station is a railway station in the municipality of La Chaux-de-Fonds, in the Swiss canton of Neuchâtel. It is located on the  La Chaux-de-Fonds–Glovelier line of the Chemins de fer du Jura.

Services 
 the following services stop at La Chaux-de-Fonds-Est:

References

External links 
 
 

Railway stations in the canton of Neuchâtel
Chemins de fer du Jura stations